Dizzy: Prince of the Yolkfolk is an adventure video game published in December 1991 by Codemasters for the Amstrad CPC, Atari ST, Commodore 64, ZX Spectrum, MS-DOS, NES and Amiga. It was the sixth game in the Dizzy adventure series. Initially it was only released as part of the Dizzy's Excellent Adventures compilation. The creators of the series, the Oliver Twins, outsourced the video game company Big Red Software to design and develop the game. The game interface and mechanics resemble those of Magicland Dizzy, discarding changes introduced in the fifth game.

The game was enhanced and re-released in November 1992 with the Aladdin Deck Enhancer under the title Dizzy The Adventurer. The title was then released in 1993 as part of The Excellent Dizzy Collection. An HD remake of this game was released on the Android and iOS platforms in December 9, 2011.

References

External links
 

1991 video games
Dizzy (series)
Codemasters games
Amstrad CPC games
ZX Spectrum games
Commodore 64 games
Amiga games
Atari ST games
DOS games
Nintendo Entertainment System games
Unauthorized video games
Amiga CD32 games
Video games scored by Allister Brimble
Video games scored by Matthew Simmonds
Video games developed in the United Kingdom
Big Red Software games
Single-player video games